Supreme Blue Dream is the debut album by the American bi-lingual indie rock band Winter. It was released on March 10, 2015 through digital download and physical formats.

Promotion 
The album spawned three singles: "Crazy", "Some Kind of Surprise" and "Pretender". Music videos were released for all three tracks.

The band embarked on a 2-year international tour in support of the album, touring through the United States, Brazil and Argentina.

Track listing

References 

2015 debut albums
Samira Winter albums